Jokūbaičiai (formerly) is a village in Kėdainiai district municipality, in Kaunas County, in central Lithuania. According to the 2011 census, the village has a population of 20 people. It is located 4 km from Gudžiūnai, by the Srautas river.

History
Jokūbačiai is mentioned as a royal village in the 18th century. During the Second World War Nazis killed 7 inhabitants of Jokūbačiai.

Demography

References

Villages in Kaunas County
Kėdainiai District Municipality